Los Frikis or the Frikis is a Cuban punk subculture that originated in the 1980s. As Cuban radio stations rarely played rock music, Frikis often listened to music by picking up radio frequencies from stations in nearby Florida. While many Frikas in the early-1990s entered AIDS clinics by knowingly injecting HIV-positive blood into them, others began congregating at El patio de María, a community centre in Havana that was one of the few venues in the city that allowed rock bands to play. Some Frikis also participate in squatting as an act of political defiance.

In a 2017 article for Time Out, journalist Jake Newby described the movement as in decline, due to "only a handful of Los Frikis remain[ing]".

Etymology
The name "Frikis" is a Spanish-take on the English word "freaky", to mean something that causes fright. In an article for Public Radio International, Frikis were defined as "the most extreme members of the rock scene". In Conflict and Change in Cuba by Enrique A. Baloyra and James A. Morris, the term was defined as referring to youths who practice anti-social behaviour, have dropped out of mainstream education, refuse to conform to the norms of Cuban society, wear black, have long hair and listen to rock music". In Teen Lives around the World: A Global Encyclopedia, author Karen Wells described Frikis as a group who listen to hardcore punk that is synonymous with the modern punk subculture. Author Julia Cooke described the group as a subculture of anarcho-punks, that are fans of rock and heavy metal.

In an article for the Havana Times, writer Dmitri Prieto claimed that the term was first used in the 1970s in reference to those who attended folk music performances, equating this definition as similar to hippies. Similarly, both TheJournal.ie and NDTV referred to the modern group as "hippie-punk".

Fashion
Frikis' fashion is based around extreme hair styles, clothing and body modification such as mohawks, tattoos, piercings, stretched ears and long hair. Clothing often features skulls, rips and rock band logos. The Other Side of Paradise: Life in the New Cuba author Julia Cooke described a particular group of Frikis that she met as wearing a "mid-nineties punk-grunge hodgepodge; torn jeans, wallet chains, boots, scruffy Converse shoes, ink limbs. Each sculpted his hair into a Mohawk".

Response
In its beginning, the subculture was seen as a threat to the collectivism of Cuban society, leading to make Frikis becoming victims of discrimination and police brutality. According to the New Times Broward-Palm Beach some Frikis were "rejected by family and often jailed or fined by the government", the 1980s Friki woman Yoandra Cardoso however has that argued that much of the response was verbal harassment from law enforcement. Dionisio Arce, lead vocalist of Cuban heavy metal band Zeus spent six years in prison due to his part in the Frikis. Some schools would forcibly shave the heads of young Frikis as a form of punishment.

AIDS epidemic
During the Special Period in the 1990s, many Frikis purposely contracted AIDS in an attempt to escape the effects of the economic crisis by entering state-run AIDS clinics, referred to as sanatoriums. One of the first to do so was a Friki called Papo la Bala. La Bala injected himself with the infected blood of an HIV-positive rocker and converted to Christianity on his deathbed. According to Nolan Moore, a writer for ListVerse, "hundreds of teens" followed in la Balas example. Although no official statistics exist of the numbers of infected Frikis, the University of Pennsylvania have stated that "many estimate that approximately 200 people–mostly men–had infected themselves" and that "not realizing it spread through sexual contact, many of their girlfriends also suffered from the consequences of their actions". In a 2017 documentary by Vice Media, a Friki called Yoandra Cardoso said that "When the sanatorium first opened, it was 100% Frikis."

The government responded to this movement by reducing the amount shops where syringes could be bought, in an attempt to reduce injection of contaminated blood. Within two years of the beginning of the movement, eighteen Frikis had died as a result.

While in the clinics, some doctors also allowed patients to listen bands such as Nirvana and AC/DC, and many Frikis formed punk rock bands, using "speakers made from cardboard, electric guitars from East Berlin with strings made from telephone wires, and drum kits made from the materials found in x-rays" In particular, one band that formed out of a clinic was Eskoria, who in an article by Public Radio International were described as "the founding fathers of Cuban punk".

These events led to the founding Rock vs AIDS, a campaign started by Maria Gattorno that promoted safe sex by handing out information leaflets and condoms to Frikis. It also led to a larger social and governmental acceptance of Frikis and rock music in general

References

Musical subcultures
Underground culture
Youth culture
1980s in Cuba
Punk
Heavy metal subculture
Cuban music